Alexey Andreevich Kovalev () is a Russian journalist, translator, media manager and commentator. He is the head of investigative desk at Meduza, former editor-in-chief of Russian Coda Media and former editor-in-chief of inoSMI.

Early life and career 
Alexey Kovalev was born in Moscow in a family of art historians.

In London, he was writing articles for Wired and The Guardian and has been a correspondent for the  magazine since March 2011.

Kovalev moved to Moscow and from 1 March 2012 to 9 December 2013 was the editor-in-chief of the inoSMI website, which publishes translations of foreign media articles. inoSMI is part of RIA Novosti, a Russian state-controlled news agency, and formally Kovalev was the head of the department at RIA Novosti. He was fired as a result of the formal liquidation of RIA Novosti and news agency's transfer under the control of Rossiya Segodnya, a Russian state-controlled media group.

In September 2014, Kovalev launched The Noodle Remover project, which fought against fake news. Also, until 1 March 2019, he was the editor-in-chief of the Russian version of the Coda Media website.

Since March 2019, he has been the head of the investigative desk of the Meduza website. By this time, The Noodle Remover became inactive.

Kovalev has also written for The Moscow Times and The New York Times.

Awards 
Redkollegia:

 in June 2017 for the article "Who and how is sawing millions on the deception of Muscovites";
 in January 2021, together with Lilia Yapparova, Denis Dmitriev and Mikhail Maglov, for the article “It’s good to be the president”;
 in April 2022, together with Anastasia Chumakova, Damir Nigmatullin, and Liliya Yapparova, for the article "I can do whatever I want to you".

References

External links 
 Noodleremover.news
 Kovalev's articles in The Guardian

Russian investigative journalists
Redkollegia award winners
Russian journalists
Meduza
Moscow State University alumni
Alumni of City, University of London
The Guardian people

Living people

Year of birth missing (living people)
The Moscow Times